Magdalena is a town on the Itonomas River in the Beni Department in northern Bolivia, capital of the Iténez Province and the Magdalena Municipality.

It is served by Magdalena Airport.

History
The Jesuit mission of Santa María Magdalena (or Santa Magdalena) was founded in 1720. Itonama Indians resided at the mission.

Climate 
The yearly precipitation of the region is 1,600 mm, with a distinct dry season from May to September. Monthly average temperatures vary from 24 °C und 29 °C over the year. According to the Köppen classification system Magdalenas has a Tropical savanna climate, abbreviated "Aw".

References

 www.ine.gov.bo

Populated places in Beni Department
Jesuit Missions of Moxos